Moiz Cohen (1883 in Serres, Salonica Vilayet, Ottoman Empire – 1961 in Nice, France) was a Turkish writer, philosopher, and journalist of Jewish heritage. He became an ideologue of different movements at different times: Ottomanism, Pan-Turkism, and Kemalism. Born to a Jewish family, he later changed his name to Munis Tekinalp.

Biography 

He was sent for schooling in the Alliance Israélite Universelle school in Salonica, continuing for a rabbinical ordination (though he never practiced). He would later continue to legal studies in Salonica, completing them in Constantinople (present-day Istanbul) after Salonica fell to Greece.

In 1905, he began to write for the newspaper Asır, later renamed into the Yeni Asır where he worked for five years and was promoted to its editor-in-chief. In 1912 he left Salonica for Istanbul, where he began teaching law and economics at the Istanbul University and was engaged in tabac export. He published an economy magazine for the Association of Economy and served as a consultant for some companies until 1918.

He would later become one of the advocates of Turkish nationalism and an ideologue of Pan-Turkism. After 1923, he became a passionate ideologue of Kemalism and wrote a standard work about it. He taught in the community schools, and entered active politics in the Republican People's Party (CHP) for which he served in the city council. Tekinalp ran for the general elections in 1954 and 1957, however he could not enter the parliament. He served as the secretary general of the Istanbul Chamber of Commerce. He wrote for the newspapers Cumhuriyet, Vatan, Akşam, Hürriyet, and Son Posta.

He was an adherent of the idea of a forceful Turkification of the minorities within the Turkish Republic and wrote such in his pamphlet Türkleştirme (1928). In 1934 he, Hanri Soriano and Marsel Franko, also Jews, founded the Turkish Culture Association (Türk Kültür Cemiyeti) for the promotion of the Turkish language. He presented the principles of Kemalism in a book published in Istanbul in 1936, then updated and translated them into French one year later, with a preface by Édouard Herriot (Le Kémalisme, Paris: Félix Alcan Publisher, 1937).

Following his retirement from the Turkish Language Association in 1956, he moved to Nice, France, where he died in 1961. He was buried in the Jewish cemetery of Nice.

Works

References

External links

20th-century French philosophers
20th-century non-fiction writers
1883 births
1961 deaths
People from Serres
Republican People's Party (Turkey) politicians
Turkish non-fiction writers
Turkish philosophers
Cumhuriyet people
Hürriyet people
Vatan people
Akşam people
Pan-Turkists
Turkish nationalists
Academic staff of Istanbul University
Istanbul University Faculty of Law alumni